Earl Kitchener, of Khartoum and of Broome in the County of Kent, was a title in the Peerage of the United Kingdom. It was created in 1914 for the famous soldier Field Marshal Herbert Kitchener, 1st Viscount Kitchener of Khartoum. He had already been created Baron Kitchener of Khartoum, and of Aspall in the County of Suffolk, in 1898, Viscount Kitchener of Khartoum, and of the Vaal River in the Transvaal Colony, and of Aspall in the County of Suffolk, in 1902, and was made Baron Denton, of Denton in the County of Kent, and Viscount Broome, of Broome in the County of Kent, at the same time he was granted the earldom. These titles were also in the Peerage of the United Kingdom.

The barony of 1898 was created with normal remainder to the heirs male of his body. However, all the other titles (those of 1902 and 1914) were created with remainder to
the heirs male of his body, failing which to
his first daughter and the heirs male of her body, failing which to
his other daughters and the heirs male of their bodies, failing which to
his elder brother Colonel Henry Kitchener and the heirs male of his body, failing which to
his youngest brother Lieutenant-General Sir Walter Kitchener (who was alive at the time of the 1902 creation but deceased at the time of the 1914 creations) and the heirs male of his body.

A third brother, Arthur Kitchener (also alive at the time of the 1902 creation but deceased at the time of the 1914 creations), was not included in either special remainder.

The first earl died unmarried and childless in 1916, which resulted in the extinction of the barony created in 1898. However, he was succeeded in the other titles under the special remainder by his elder brother, Colonel Henry Kitchener, as second earl. His only son, Henry, Viscount Broome, predeceased him, and so he was succeeded by his grandson, also Henry, Viscount Broome, as third earl. The third earl died unmarried and childless in 2011. His younger brother, the Hon. Charles Kitchener, had died in 1982, and the line of Lieutenant-General Sir Walter Kitchener had failed on the death of his younger son, Squadron Leader Henry Kitchener, in 1984. The titles therefore became extinct.

The Hon. Charles Kitchener, brother of the third earl, had one daughter, Emma Kitchener (born 1963), who on the third earl's death became the first earl's heir general. She is a lady-in-waiting to Princess Michael of Kent and is married to the actor, screenwriter, film director and novelist Lord Fellowes. Fellowes publicly expressed his dissatisfaction that the proposals to change the rules of royal succession were not extended to peerages, which would have allowed his wife to succeed as 4th Countess on her uncle's death. On 9 May 2012 the Queen issued a Royal Warrant of Precedence allowing Lady Fellowes to enjoy the same rank and title of the daughter of an earl, as if her late father had survived his brother and therefore succeeded to the title.

The family seat was Westergate Wood, near Arundel, Sussex.

Earls Kitchener (1914)
Horatio Herbert Kitchener, 1st Earl Kitchener (1850–1916)
Henry Elliott Chevallier Kitchener, 2nd Earl Kitchener (1846–1937)
Henry Franklin Chevallier Kitchener, Viscount Broome (1878–1928)
Henry Herbert Kitchener, 3rd Earl Kitchener (1919–2011)

Note

References

Sources

Kidd, Charles, Williamson, David (editors). Debrett's Peerage and Baronetage (1990 edition). New York: St Martin's Press, 1990, 

The London Gazette

 
1914 establishments in the United Kingdom
2011 disestablishments in the United Kingdom
Extinct earldoms in the Peerage of the United Kingdom
Noble titles created in 1914
Peerages created with special remainders